Deputy Chief of the Air Staff (DCAS) may refer to:

 Deputy Chief of the Air Staff (Australia)
 Deputy Chief of the Air Staff (India)
 Deputy Chief of the Air Staff (Pakistan)
 Deputy Chief of the Air Staff (United Kingdom)